Artem Semenenko (born 2 September 1988) is a Ukrainian professional footballer who plays as a midfielder. He is a free agent.

Career
Artem Semenko is a product of Metalurh Zaporizhzhia Youth school system, where he was trained by Yevheniy Bulhakov.  He game his debut for the senior team on 17 June 2005, in a home match against Borysfen Boryspil.

In February 2010 Semenko moved on a free transfer to Premier League side Zorya Luhansk.

In August 2012, after two and a half years at Zorya, Semenenko joined Romanian Liga I team CSMS Iași on a one-year contract.

References

External links
 Profile on EUFO
 Profile on Football Squads
 

1988 births
Living people
Ukrainian footballers
Ukrainian expatriate footballers
Ukrainian Premier League players
FC Metalurh Zaporizhzhia players
FC Zorya Luhansk players
Liga I players
FC Politehnica Iași (2010) players
FC Tavria-Skif Rozdol players
Expatriate footballers in Romania
Ukrainian expatriate sportspeople in Romania
Association football midfielders
Footballers from Kyiv